Methylorubrum podarium  is a Gram-negative bacteria from the genus Methylorubrum which has been isolated from a human foot in the United Kingdom.

References

Further reading

External links
Type strain of Methylobacterium podarium at BacDive -  the Bacterial Diversity Metadatabase

Hyphomicrobiales
Bacteria described in 2006